Pasay has a total of 201 barangays grouped into 20 zones and 2 districts. The barangays do not have names but are only designated with sequential numbers.

References

External links
 http://www.pasay.gov.ph/Barangay.html

Geography of Metro Manila